Ronnie Dean Tinsley is a singer/songwriter as a solo artist in the outlaw country, Americana, Metal genres. He also owns and operates a service, construction, design and maintenance company based in Texas.

Music career
After founding Houston based metal band "The Hectic" with Ken Pride in 2003 as the lone guitarist, Tinsley moved to lead singer/songwriter (Ronnie Tinsley ASCAP) after parting ways with original singer James Hook, The Hectic, as lead singer, and songwriter/lyricist.  He recorded the EP Reborn with that band which contained 4 originals by Tinsley.

Seven years later, in 2010 he wrote 11 songs for The Hectic's self-titled debut album also released and published by The Black Light District (ASCAP) with Brian Baker of Sound Arts Recording Studio's in Houston, Texas at the production helm having previously worked with artist and labels such as Blue October, Free Radicals, Geto Boys, Epic Records, Columbia Records.

Again with Brian Baker at the production helm, in 2014, Tinsley started writing, producing and recording his debut solo effort "Ronnie Dean Tinsley & The Dark Horse Rodeo" - Album: Renegade.  Performing on 10 of the album tracks was Brian Thomas, Anthony Sapp, David Delagarza III of Grammy award winning group La Mafia, Billie Jean Hughes, Tammy Akins and Steve Allison.  March 25, 2016, The Black Light District releases a solo album by Tinsley that will have single released to Texas Radio as well as Americana and Ameritopia National/International radio promotions along with world-wide distribution via INGrooves Music Group.

Businessman
Tinsley is co-founder and owner of The Rice Tinsley Corporation; a large scale commercial, industrial and residential service, construction and design company based in Texas.

Discography

Reborn – The Hectic, 2003, The Black Light District
The Hectic – The Hectic, 2010, The Black Light District
Renegade – Ronnie Dean Tinsley & The Dark Horse Rodeo, 2015, The Black Light District

References 

 2017 Voyage Houston interview
 2016 Sun Herald - Sound Check
 2016 "issue_id":"294042","page":0} Texas Hot Country Magazine - Ronnie Dean Tinsley
 2015 IndieExtreme
 2010 Houston Bands
 2011 MM55 Productions reviews and News.
 June 5, 2006 Houston Chronicle reviews and news
 June 22, 2011 Houston News Rhonda Merideth

External links 
 
 Internet Movie Data Base (IMDb) Ronnie Tinsley
 Ronnie Dean Tinsley VEVO
 thehectic.com
 ricetinsleycorp.com

American rock musicians
Singer-songwriters from Texas
21st-century American businesspeople
Living people
American country singer-songwriters
American country rock singers
1975 births
Writers from Houston
Musicians from Houston
21st-century American singers
Country musicians from Texas